The Treaty of Establishment, Commerce and Navigation (or the Treaty of Establishment, Commerce and Navigation with Full Protocols and Annex) was signed on August 25, 1935, between representatives of Iran and the Soviet Union. This accord helped to reinforce the tenets of the Russo-Persian Treaty of Friendship. Based on the terms of the treaty, both signatories reinforced their respective rights to fly their national flags on their respective commercial vessels. Moreover, both signatories were allowed to fish in the Caspian Sea within ten nautical miles (19 km) of the coastline.

See also
List of treaties

References

Sources
Mehdiyoun, Kamyar. "Ownership of Oil and Gas Resources in the Caspian Sea." The American Journal of International Law. Vol. 94, No. 1 (January 2000), pp. 179–189.

1935 in the Soviet Union
Treaties of the Soviet Union
Iran–Soviet Union relations
Iran–Soviet Union border
Treaties concluded in 1935
Treaties of Pahlavi Iran
Commercial treaties
1935 in Iran
1935 in economics
Foreign trade of the Soviet Union